Dame Jocelyn May Woollcombe,  (9 May 1898 – 30 January 1986) was Director of the Women's Royal Naval Service (WRNS) from 1946 to 1950.

She joined the WRNS as a chief officer in August 1939 and was promoted superintendent on 14 May 1940.

Honours
She was appointed Commander of the Order of the British Empire (CBE) in 1944 and Dame Commander of the Order of the British Empire (DBE) in 1950.

Post-war
 Hon. ADC to HM, the King – 1949
 General Secretary, British Council for Aid to Refugees (Hungarian Section) – 1957–1958
 Governor, The Sister Trust – 1956–1965
 Governor WRNS Benevolent Trust – 1942–1967
 President, Association of Wrens – 1959–1981

Sources
Stark, Suzanne. Female tars: Women aboard ship in the age of sail; Naval Inst. Press: Annapolis, Maryland (1996); /LCCN#95046459.

External links
Oxford University record #101060971
Portrait at NPG

1898 births
1986 deaths
Royal Navy officers of World War II
Dames Commander of the Order of the British Empire
Women's Royal Naval Service officers
British women in World War II
Place of birth missing
Place of death missing